Anarchism is the political philosophy which holds ruling classes and the state to be undesirable, unnecessary and harmful, and opposes authority and hierarchical organization in the conduct of human relations.

Proponents of anarchism, known as anarchists, advocate stateless societies based on non-hierarchical voluntary associations. However, anarchist schools of thought can differ fundamentally, supporting anything from extreme individualism to complete collectivism to more syncretic tendencies (such as insurrectionary anarchism). Strains of anarchism have often been divided into the categories of social anarchism and individualist anarchism or similar dual classifications, also including green anarchism and post-left anarchism.

Anarchism is usually considered a radical left-wing or far-left ideology and much of anarchist economics and legal philosophy reflect anti-authoritarian, anti-statist and libertarian interpretations of radical left-wing and socialist politics. At some point, "the collectivist, communist, and liberal and individualist strands of thought from which anarchists drew their inspiration began to assume an increasingly distinctive quality, supporting the rise of a number of anarchist schools".

Anthropologist David Graeber has noted that while the major Marxist schools of thought always have founders (e.g. Leninism, Trotskyism and Maoism), schools of anarchism "almost invariably emerge from some kind of organizational principle or form of practice", citing anarcho-syndicalism, individualist anarchism and platformism as examples.

Classical anarchism 
The decades of the late 19th and the early 20th centuries constitute the belle époque of anarchist history. In this classical era, roughly defined as the 1840s or the 1860s to 1939, anarchism played a prominent role in working-class struggles alongside Marxism in Europe as well as North and Latin America, Asia and Australia. Modernism, mass migration, railroads and access to printing all helped anarchists to advance their causes.

Mutualism 

Mutualism began in 18th-century English and French labor movements, then took an anarchist form associated with Pierre-Joseph Proudhon in France and others in the United States. This influenced individualist anarchists in the United States such as Benjamin Tucker and William B. Greene. Josiah Warren proposed similar ideas in 1833 after participating in a failed Owenite experiment. In the 1840s and 1850s, Charles A. Dana and William Batchelder Greene introduced Proudhon's works to the United States. Greene adapted Proudhon's mutualism to American conditions and introduced it to Benjamin Tucker.

Mutualist anarchism is concerned with reciprocity, free association, voluntary contract, federation and credit and currency reform. Many mutualists believe a market without government intervention drives prices down to labor-costs, eliminating profit, rent and interest according to the labor theory of value. Firms would be forced to compete over workers just as workers compete over firms, raising wages.

Some see mutualism as between individualist and collectivist anarchism. In What Is Property?, Proudhon develops a concept of "liberty", equivalent to "anarchy", which is the dialectical "synthesis of communism and property". Greene, influenced by Pierre Leroux, sought mutualism in the synthesis of three philosophies—communism, capitalism and socialism. Later individualist anarchists used the term mutualism, but retained little emphasis on synthesis while social anarchists such as the authors of An Anarchist FAQ claim mutualism as a subset of their philosophical tradition.

Social anarchism 

Social anarchism is a broad category of anarchism independent of individualist anarchism. Where individualist forms of anarchism emphasize personal autonomy and the rational nature of human beings, social anarchism sees "individual freedom as conceptually connected with social equality and emphasize community and mutual aid". Social anarchism is used to specifically describe anarchist tendencies within anarchism that have an emphasis on the communitarian and cooperative aspects of anarchist theory and practice. Social anarchism includes (but is not limited to) collectivist anarchism, anarcho-communism, libertarian socialism, anarcho-syndicalism and social ecology.

Collectivist anarchism 

Collectivist anarchism is a revolutionary form of anarchism most commonly associated with Mikhail Bakunin, Johann Most and the anti-authoritarian section of the First International. Unlike mutualists, collectivist anarchists oppose all private ownership of the means of production, instead advocating that ownership be collectivized. This was to be initiated by small cohesive elite group through acts of violence, or "propaganda by the deed", which would inspire the workers to revolt and forcibly collectivize the means of production. Workers would be compensated for their work on the basis of the amount of time they contributed to production, rather than goods being distributed "according to need" as in anarcho-communism. Although the collectivist anarchists advocated compensation for labor, some held out the possibility of a post-revolutionary transition to a communist system of distribution according to need. Collective anarchism arose contemporaneously with Marxism, but it opposed the Marxist dictatorship of the proletariat despite Marxism striving for a collectivist stateless society.

Some collectivist anarchists do not oppose the use of currency. Some support workers being paid based on the amount of time they contributed to production. These salaries would be used to purchase commodities in a communal market. This contrasts with anarcho-communism where wages would be abolished and where individuals would take freely from a storehouse of goods "to each according to his need". Many modern-day collectivist anarchists hold their form of anarchism as a permanent society rather than a carryover to anarcho-communism or a gift economy. Some collectivist anarchists such as proponents of participatory economics believe in remuneration and a form of credit but do not believe in money or markets.

Although collectivist anarchism shares many similarities with anarchist communism, there are several key differences between them. For example, collectivist anarchists believe that the economy and most or all property should be collectively owned by society while anarchist communists by contrast believe that the concept of ownership should be rejected by society and replaced with the concept of usage. In addition, collectivist anarchists often favor using a form of currency to compensate workers according to the amount of time spent contributing to society and production while anarcho-communists believe that currency and wages should be abolished all together and goods should be distributed "to each according to his or her need".

Anarcho-communism 

Anarcho-communism is a theory of anarchism which advocates the abolition of the state, markets, money, private property (while retaining respect for personal property) and capitalism in favor of common ownership of the means of production, direct democracy and a horizontal network of voluntary associations and workers' councils with production and consumption based on the guiding principle: "From each according to his ability, to each according to his need".

Some forms of anarchist communism such as insurrectionary anarchism are strongly influenced by egoism and radical individualism, believing anarcho-communism is the best social system for the realization of individual freedom. Most anarcho-communists view it as a way of reconciling the opposition between the individual and society.

Anarcho-communism developed out of radical socialist currents after the French Revolution, but it was first formulated as such in the Italian section of the First International. The theoretical work of Peter Kropotkin took importance later as it expanded and developed pro-organizationalist and insurrectionary anti-organizationalist sections.

To date, the best-known examples of an anarchist communist society, i.e. established around the ideas as they exist today and achieving worldwide attention and knowledge in the historical canon) are the anarchist territories after the Russian Revolution, the Korean People's Association in Manchuria and the Spanish Revolution.

During the Russian Civil War, anarchists such as Nestor Makhno worked through the Revolutionary Insurgent Army of Ukraine to create and defend anarcho-communism in Ukraine from 1919 before being conquered by the Bolsheviks in 1921. In 1929, anarcho-communism was achieved in Manchuria by the Korean People's Association in Manchuria (KPAM), with help from anarchist general and independence activist Kim Chwa-chin, lasting until 1931, when Imperial Japan assassinated Kim and invaded from the south while the Chinese Nationalists invaded from the north, resulting in the creation of Manchukuo, a puppet state of the Empire of Japan. Through the efforts and influence of the Spanish anarchists during the Spanish Revolution within the Spanish Civil War, starting in 1936 anarcho-communism existed in most of Aragon; parts of Andalusia and the Levante; and in the stronghold of Revolutionary Catalonia, before being crushed by the combined forces of fascist Francoism, Nazi Germany and Fascist Italy as well as Spanish Communist Party repression backed by the Soviet Union and economic and armaments blockades from the capitalist countries and the Spanish Republic itself.

Individualist anarchism 

Individualist anarchism is a set of several traditions of thought within the anarchist movement that emphasize the individual and their will over any kinds of external determinants such as groups, society, traditions and ideological systems.

Philosophical anarchism 

In founding philosophical anarchism, William Godwin developed what many consider the first expression of modern anarchist thought. According to Peter Kropotkin, Godwin was "the first to formulate the political and economical conceptions of anarchism, even though he did not give that name to the ideas developed in his work". Philosophical anarchism contends that the state lacks moral legitimacy; that there is no individual obligation or duty to obey the state and conversely that the state has no right to command individuals, but it does not advocate revolution to eliminate the state. According to The Blackwell Dictionary of Modern Social Thought, philosophical anarchism "is a component especially of individualist anarchism".

Philosophical anarchists may accept the existence of a minimal state as an unfortunate and usually temporary "necessary evil", but argue that citizens do not have a moral obligation to obey the state when its laws conflict with individual autonomy. As conceived by Godwin, it requires individuals to act in accordance with their own judgments and to allow every other individual the same liberty—conceived egoistically as by Max Stirner, it implies that "the unique one" who truly "owns himself" recognizes no duties to others; and within the limit of his might, he does what is right for him. Godwin opposed revolutionary action and saw a minimal state as a present "necessary evil" that would become increasingly irrelevant and powerless by the gradual spread of knowledge. Godwin advocated extreme individualism, proposing that all cooperation in labor be eliminated. Godwin felt discrimination on any grounds besides ability was intolerable.

Rather than throwing bombs or taking up arms to bring down the state, philosophical anarchists "have worked for a gradual change to free the individual from what they thought were the oppressive laws and social constraints of the modern state and allow all individuals to become self-determining and value-creating". They may oppose the immediate elimination of the state by violent means out of concern that it would be left unsecured against the establishment of a more harmful and oppressive state. This is especially true among those anarchists who consider violence and the state as synonymous, or who consider it counterproductive where public reaction to violence results in increased "law enforcement" efforts.

Egoist anarchism 

Egoist anarchism originated in the philosophy of Max Stirner, a 19th-century Hegelian philosopher whose "name appears with familiar regularity in historically orientated surveys of anarchist thought as one of the earliest and best-known exponents of individualist anarchism". Stirner's philosophy is usually called "egoism" as he says that the egoist rejects devotion to "a great idea, a cause, a doctrine, a system, a lofty calling", saying that the egoist has no political calling but rather "lives themselves out" without regard to "how well or ill humanity may fare thereby". Stirner held that the only limitation on the rights of the individual is his power to obtain what he desires. He proposes that most commonly accepted social institutions – including the notion of state, property as a right, natural rights in general and the very notion of society – were mere spooks in the mind. Stirner wanted to "abolish not only the state but also society as an institution responsible for its members".

Stirner's idea of the Union of egoists was first expounded in The Ego and Its Own. The Union is understood as a non-systematic association, which Stirner proposed in contradistinction to the state. The Union is understood as a relation between egoists which is continually renewed by all parties' support through an act of will. The Union requires that all parties participate out of a conscious egoism. If one party silently finds themselves to be suffering, but puts up with it and keeps up appearances, the Union has degenerated into something else. This Union is not seen as an authority above a person's own will. This idea has received interpretations for politics, economic and sex/love.

Forms of libertarian communism such as insurrectionary anarchism are influenced by Stirner. Emma Goldman was influenced by both Stirner and Peter Kropotkin and blended their philosophies together in her own.

The Scottish-born German writer John Henry Mackay found out about Stirner while reading a copy of Friedrich Albert Lange's History of Materialism and Critique of its Present Importance. Later, Mackay looked for a copy of The Ego and Its Own and after being fascinated with it he wrote a biography of Stirner (Max Stirner – sein Leben und sein Werk), published in German in 1898. Mackay's propaganda of stirnerist egoism and of male homosexual and bisexual rights affected Adolf Brand, who in 1896 published the world's first ongoing homosexual publication, Der Eigene. Another later German anarchist publication influenced deeply by Stirner was Der Einzige. It appeared in 1919, as a weekly, then sporadically until 1925 and was edited by cousins Anselm Ruest (pseud. for Ernst Samuel) and Mynona (pseudonym for Salomo Friedlaender).

Stirnerian egoism became a main influence on European individualist anarchism including its main proponents in the early 20th century such as Émile Armand and Han Ryner in France, Renzo Novatore in Italy, Miguel Giménez Igualada in Spain and in Russia Lev Chernyi. Illegalism was an anarchist practice that developed primarily in France, Italy, Belgium and Switzerland during the early 1900s that found justification in Stirner's philosophy. The illegalists openly embraced criminality as a lifestyle. Some American individualist anarchists such as Benjamin Tucker, abandoned natural rights positions and converted to Max Stirner's egoist anarchism. John Beverley Robinson wrote an essay called "Egoism" in which he states that "[m]odern egoism, as propounded by Stirner and Nietzsche, and expounded by Ibsen, Shaw and others, is all these; but it is more. It is the realization by the individual that they are an individual; that, as far as they are concerned, they are the only individual". Anarchist communist Emma Goldman was influenced by both Stirner and Peter Kropotkin as well as the Russian strain of individualist anarchism and blended these philosophies together in her own, as shown in books of hers such as Anarchism And Other Essays. Enrico Arrigoni (pseudonym: Frank Brand) was an Italian American individualist anarchist Lathe operator, house painter, bricklayer, dramatist and political activist influenced by the work of Stirner. Stirner's philosophy also found followers in Colombia in Biófilo Panclasta and in Japan in Jun Tsuji and Sakae Osugi.

In the 1980s, it emerged in the United States the tendency of post-left anarchy which was influenced profoundly by Stirnerist egoism in aspects such as the critique of ideology.

Individualist anarchism in the United States 

Josiah Warren is widely regarded as the first American anarchist and the four-page weekly paper he edited during 1833, The Peaceful Revolutionist, was the first anarchist periodical published. For American anarchist historian Eunice Minette Schuster, "[i]t is apparent...that Proudhonian Anarchism was to be found in the United States at least as early as 1848 and that it was not conscious of its affinity to the Individualist Anarchism of Josiah Warren and Stephen Pearl Andrews...William B. Greene presented this Proudhonian Mutualism in its purest and most systematic form". Henry David Thoreau (1817–1862) was an important early influence in individualist anarchist thought in the United States and Europe. Thoreau was an American author, poet, naturalist, tax resister, development critic, surveyor, historian, philosopher and leading transcendentalist. He is best known for his books Walden, a reflection upon simple living in natural surroundings, as well as his essay, Civil Disobedience, an argument for individual resistance to civil government in moral opposition to an unjust state. Later, Benjamin Tucker fused Stirner's egoism with the economics of Warren and Proudhon in his eclectic influential publication Liberty.

An important concern for American individualist anarchism was free love. Free love particularly stressed women's rights since most sexual laws discriminated against women—for example, marriage laws and anti-birth control measures. The most important American free love journal was Lucifer the Lightbearer (1883–1907) edited by Moses Harman and Lois Waisbrooker, but also there existed Ezra Heywood and Angela Heywood's The Word (1872–1890, 1892–1893). Free Society (1895–1897 as The Firebrand; 1897–1904 as Free Society) was a major anarchist newspaper in the United States at the end of the 19th and beginning of the 20th centuries. The publication staunchly advocated free love and women's rights and critiqued "Comstockery" – censorship of sexual information. Also M. E. Lazarus was an important American individualist anarchist who promoted free love.

Freethought also motivated activism in this movement. "Freethought was a basically anti-christian, anti-clerical movement, whose purpose was to make the individual politically and spiritually free to decide for himself on religious matters. A number of contributors to Liberty (anarchist publication) were prominent figures in both freethought and anarchism. The individualist anarchist George MacDonald was a co-editor of Freethought and, for a time, The Truth Seeker. E.C. Walker was co-editor of the excellent free-thought / free love journal Lucifer, the Light-Bearer". "Many of the anarchists were ardent freethinkers; reprints from freethought papers such as Lucifer, the Light-Bearer, Freethought and The Truth Seeker appeared in Liberty...The church was viewed as a common ally of the state and as a repressive force in and of itself".

Individualist anarchism in Europe 

European Individualist anarchism proceeded from the roots laid by William Godwin, Pierre-Joseph Proudhon and Max Stirner. Proudhon was an early pioneer of anarchism as well as of the important individualist anarchist current of mutualism. Stirner became a central figure of individualist anarchism through the publication of his seminal work The Ego and Its Own which is considered to be "a founding text in the tradition of individualist anarchism". Another early figure was Anselme Bellegarrigue. Individualist anarchism expanded and diversified through Europe, incorporating influences from North American individualist anarchism.

European individualist anarchists include Max Stirner, Albert Libertad, Anselme Bellegarrigue, Émile Armand, Enrico Arrigoni, Lev Chernyi, John Henry Mackay, Han Ryner, Renzo Novatore, Miguel Giménez Igualada and currently Michel Onfray. Two influential authors in European individualist anarchists are Friedrich Nietzsche (see Anarchism and Friedrich Nietzsche) and Georges Palante.

From the legacy of Proudhon and Stirner there emerged a strong tradition of French individualist anarchism. An early figure was Anselme Bellegarrigue. He participated in the French Revolution of 1848, was author and editor of Anarchie, Journal de l'Ordre and Au fait ! Au fait ! Interprétation de l'idée démocratique and wrote the important early Anarchist Manifesto in 1850. Autonomie Individuelle was an individualist anarchist publication that ran from 1887 to 1888. It was edited by Jean-Baptiste Louiche, Charles Schæffer and Georges Deherme. This tradition later continued with such intellectuals as Albert Libertad, André Lorulot, Émile Armand, Victor Serge, Zo d'Axa and Rirette Maîtrejean, who in 1905 developed theory in the main individualist anarchist journal in France, L'Anarchie. Outside this journal, Han Ryner wrote Petit Manuel individualiste (1903) and later appeared the journal L'En-Dehors created by Zo d'Axa in 1891.

French individualist circles had a strong sense of personal libertarianism and experimentation. Naturism and free love contents started to have a strong influence in individualist anarchist circles and from there it expanded to the rest of anarchism also appearing in Spanish individualist anarchist groups.

Anarcho-naturism was promoted by Henri Zisly, Émile Gravelle and Georges Butaud. Butaud was an individualist "partisan of the milieux libres, publisher of "Flambeau" ("an enemy of authority") in 1901 in Vienna. Most of his energies were devoted to creating anarchist colonies (communautés expérimentales) in which he participated in several.
"In this sense, the theoretical positions and the vital experiences of french individualism are deeply iconoclastic and scandalous, even within libertarian circles. The call of nudist naturism, the strong defence of birth control methods, the idea of "unions of egoists" with the sole justification of sexual practices, that will try to put in practice, not without difficulties, will establish a way of thought and action, and will result in sympathy within some, and a strong rejection within others".

Illegalism is an anarchist philosophy that developed primarily in France, Italy, Belgium and Switzerland during the early 1900s as an outgrowth of Stirner's individualist anarchism. Illegalists usually did not seek moral basis for their actions, recognizing only the reality of "might" rather than "right" and for the most part illegal acts were done simply to satisfy personal desires, not for some greater ideal, although some committed crimes as a form of propaganda of the deed. The illegalists embraced direct action and propaganda by the deed.

Spain received the influence of American individualist anarchism but most importantly it was related to the French currents. At the start of the 20th century, individualism in Spain takes force through the efforts of people such as Dorado Montero, Ricardo Mella, Federico Urales and J. Elizalde, who will translate French and American individualists. Important in this respect were also magazines such as La Idea Libre, La Revista Blanca, Etica, Iniciales, Al margen and Nosotros. In Germany, the Scottish-German John Henry Mackay became the most important propagandist for individualist anarchist ideas. Adolf Brand (1874–1945) was a German writer, stirnerist anarchist and pioneering campaigner for the acceptance of male bisexuality and homosexuality. In 1896, Brand published a German homosexual periodical, Der Eigene. The Irish anarchist writer of the Decadent movement Oscar Wilde influenced individualist anarchists such as Renzo Novatore and gained the admiration of Benjamin Tucker.

Post-classical anarchism 
Following the end of the Spanish Revolution and World War II, the anarchist movement was a "ghost" of its former self as proclaimed by anarchist historian George Woodcock. In his work Anarchism: A History of Libertarian Ideas and Movements, published 1962, Woodcock wrote that after 1936 it was "a ghost that inspires neither fear among governments nor hope among peoples nor even interest among newspapermen".

Capitalism continued to grow throughout the post-war period despite predictions from Marxist scholars that it would soon collapse under its own contradictions, yet anarchism gained a surprising surge in popular interest during the 1960s. Reasons for this were believed to be the gradual demystification of the Soviet Union and tensions at the climax of the Cold War. The New Left which arose in the 1950s was a libertarian socialist movement that was closer to anarchism. Prominent thinkers such as Herbert Marcuse and C. Wright Mills were critical of the United States and Soviet Marxism.

Green anarchism 

Green anarchism is a school of thought within anarchism which puts an emphasis on environmental issues. An important early influence was the thought of the American anarchist Henry David Thoreau and his book Walden as well as Leo Tolstoy and Élisée Reclus. In the late 19th century there emerged anarcho-naturism as the fusion of anarchism and naturist philosophies within individualist anarchist circles in France, Spain and Portugal.

Important contemporary currents are anarcho-primitivism and social ecology. Notable contemporary writers espousing green anarchism include Murray Bookchin, Daniel Chodorkoff, anthropologist Brian Morris and people around Institute for Social Ecology; and those critical of technology such as Layla AbdelRahim, Derrick Jensen, George Draffan and John Zerzan; and others such as Alan Carter.

Anarcho-primitivism 

Anarcho-primitivism is an anarchist critique of the origins and progress of civilization. According to anarcho-primitivism, the shift from hunter-gatherer to agricultural subsistence gave rise to social stratification, coercion and alienation.

Anarcho-naturism 

Anarcho-naturism appeared in the late 19th century as the union of anarchist and naturist philosophies. Mainly it had importance within individualist anarchist circles in Spain, France, Portugal and Cuba.

Anarcho-naturism advocated vegetarianism, free love, nudism, hiking and an ecological world view within anarchist groups and outside them. Anarcho-naturism promoted an ecological worldview, small ecovillages and most prominently nudism as a way to avoid the artificiality of the industrial mass society of modernity. Naturist individualist anarchists saw the individual in his biological, physical and psychological aspects and tried to eliminate social determinations.

Social ecology 

Social ecology is a social anarchist philosophy developed by Murray Bookchin in the 1960s which holds that present ecological problems are rooted in deep-seated social problems, particularly in coercive, hierarchical political and social systems. These have resulted in an uncritical acceptance of an overly competitive grow-or-die philosophy. It suggests that this cannot be resisted by individual action such as ethical consumerism, but must be addressed by more nuanced ethical thinking and collective activity grounded in radical democratic ideals. The complexity of relationships between people and with nature is emphasized, along with the importance of establishing social structures that take account of this.

Veganarchism 

Veganarchism is the political philosophy of veganism (more specifically animal liberation) and green anarchism. This encompasses viewing the state as unnecessary and harmful to both human and animals whilst practicing a vegan diet.

Anarcha-feminism 

Anarcha-feminism is a form of anarchism that synthesizes radical feminism and anarchism that views patriarchy (male domination over women) as a fundamental manifestation of involuntary hierarchy which anarchists often oppose. Anarcha-feminism was inspired in the late 19th century by the writings of early feminist anarchists such as Lucy Parsons, Emma Goldman and Voltairine de Cleyre. Anarcha-feminists, like other radical feminists, criticize and advocate the abolition of traditional conceptions of family, education and gender roles. Anarcha-feminists are especially critical of marriage. For instance, the feminist anarchist Emma Goldman has argued that marriage is a purely economic arrangement and that "[woman] pays for it with her name, her privacy, her self-respect, her very life".

Anarcha-feminists also often criticize the views of some of the traditional anarchists such as Mikhail Bakunin who believed that patriarchy is only a minor problem and is dependent only on the existence of the state and capitalism and will disappear soon after such institutions are abolished. Anarcha-feminists by contrast view patriarchy as a fundamental problem in society and believe that the feminist struggle against sexism and patriarchy is an essential component of the anarchist struggle against the state and capitalism. As Susan Brown puts it, "as anarchism is a political philosophy that opposes all relationships of power, it is inherently feminist".

Anarcho-pacifism 

Anarcho-pacifism is a form of anarchism which completely rejects the use of violence in any form for any purpose. The main precedent was Henry David Thoreau who through his work Civil Disobedience influenced both Leo Tolstoy and Mohandas Gandhi's advocacy of nonviolent resistance. As a global movement, anarchist pacifism emerged shortly before World War II in the Netherlands, Great Britain and the United States and was a strong presence in the subsequent campaigns for nuclear disarmament.

Violence has always been controversial in anarchism. While many anarchists during the 19th century embraced propaganda of the deed, Leo Tolstoy and other anarcho-pacifists directly opposed violence as a means for change. Tolstoy argued that anarchism must by nature be nonviolent, since it is by definition opposition to coercion and force and that since the state is inherently violent, meaningful pacifism must likewise be anarchistic. His philosophy was cited as a major inspiration by Gandhi, an Indian independence leader and pacifist who self-identified as an anarchist. Ferdinand Domela Nieuwenhuis was also instrumental in establishing the pacifist trend within the anarchist movement.

Religious anarchism 

Religious anarchism is a set of related anarchist ideologies that are inspired by the teachings of (organized) religions, but many anarchists have traditionally been skeptical of and opposed to organized religion. Many different religions have served as inspiration for religious forms of anarchism, most notably Christianity, as Christian anarchists believe that biblical teachings give credence to anarchist philosophy. Non-Christian forms of religious anarchism include Buddhist anarchism, Jewish anarchism and most recently Neopaganism. Neopaganism focuses on the sanctity of the environment and equality and is often of a decentralized nature. This led to a number of Neopagan-inspired anarchists, one of the most prominent of which is Starhawk, who writes extensively about both spirituality and activism.

Christian anarchism 

Christian anarchism is a form of religious anarchism that seeks to combine anarchism with Christianity, claiming that anarchism is justified by the teachings of Jesus Christ. Early Christian communities have been described by Christian anarchists and some historians as possessing anarcho-communist characteristics. Christian anarchists such as Leo Tolstoy and Ammon Hennacy believe that the teachings of Paul of Tarsus caused a shift from the earlier more egalitarian and anarchistic teachings of Jesus. However, others believe that Paul with his strong emphasis on God's Providence is to be understood as a holding to anarchist principles.

Anarchism without adjectives 

In the words of historian George Richard Esenwein, anarchism without adjectives "referred to an unhyphenated form of anarchism, that is, a doctrine without any qualifying labels such as communist, collectivist, mutualist, or individualist. For others, [...] [i]t was simply understood as an attitude that tolerated the coexistence of different anarchist schools". Anarchism without adjectives emphasizes harmony between various anarchist factions and attempts to unite them around their shared anti-authoritarian beliefs. The expression was coined by Cuban-born Fernando Tarrida del Mármol, who used it in Barcelona in November 1889 as a call for tolerance, after being troubled by the "bitter debates" between the different movements. Rudolf Rocker said that the different types of anarchism presented "only different methods of economy, the practical possibilities of which have yet to be tested, and that the first objective is to secure the personal and social freedom of men no matter upon which economics basis this is to be accomplished".

Voltairine de Cleyre was an anarchist without adjectives who initially identified herself as an individualist anarchist but later espoused a collectivist form of anarchism, while refusing to identify herself with any of the contemporary schools ("The best thing ordinary workingmen or women could do was to organise their industry to get rid of money altogether . . . Let them produce together, co-operatively rather than as employer and employed; let them fraternise group by group, let each use what he needs of his own product, and deposit the rest in the storage-houses, and let those others who need goods have them as occasion arises"). She commented that "Socialism and Communism both demand a degree of joint effort and administration which would beget more regulation than is wholly consistent with ideal Anarchism; Individualism and Mutualism, resting upon property, involve a development of the private policeman not at all compatible with my notion of freedom" although she stopped short of denouncing these tendencies as un-anarchistic ("There is nothing un-Anarchistic about any of [these systems] until the element of compulsion enters and obliges unwilling persons to remain in a community whose economic arrangements they do not agree to").

Errico Malatesta was another proponent of anarchism without adjectives, stating that "[i]t is not right for us, to say the least, to fall into strife over mere hypotheses".

Contemporary anarchism 

Anarchism generates many eclectic and syncretic philosophies and movements. Since the revival of anarchism in the mid 20th century, a number of new movements and schools have appeared. Anarchist anthropologist David Graeber has posited a rupture between generations of anarchism, with those "who often still have not shaken the sectarian habits of the last century" contrasted with the younger activists who are "much more informed, among other elements, by indigenous, feminist, ecological and cultural-critical ideas" and who by the start of the 21st century formed "by far the majority" of anarchists.

The anti-capitalist tradition of classical anarchism has remained prominent within post-classical and contemporary currents. Anarchists are committed against coercive authority in all forms, namely "all centralized and hierarchical forms of government (e.g., monarchy, representative democracy, state socialism, etc.), economic class systems (e.g., capitalism, Bolshevism, feudalism, slavery, etc.), autocratic religions (e.g., fundamentalist Islam, Roman Catholicism, etc.), patriarchy, heterosexism, white supremacy, and imperialism". Anarchist schools of thought disagree on the methods by which these forms should be opposed.

For the English anarchist scholar Simon Critchley, "contemporary anarchism can be seen as a powerful critique of the pseudo-libertarianism of contemporary neo-liberalism. One might say that contemporary anarchism is about responsibility, whether sexual, ecological or socio-economic; it flows from an experience of conscience about the manifold ways in which the West ravages the rest; it is an ethical outrage at the yawning inequality, impoverishment and disenfranchisment that is so palpable locally and globally". This might also have been motivated by "the collapse of 'really existing socialism' and the capitulation to neo-liberalism of Western social democracy".

Anarcho-transhumanism 

Anarcho-transhumanism is the synthesis of anarchism with transhumanism that is concerned with both social and physical freedom, respectively. Anarcho-transhumanists define freedom as the expansion of one's own ability to experience the world around them.

The philosophy draws heavily from the individualist anarchism of William Godwin and Voltairine de Cleyre as well as the cyberfeminism presented by Donna Haraway in A Cyborg Manifesto. It looks at issues surrounding bodily autonomy, disability, gender, neurodiversity, queer theory science and sexuality.

Anarcho-transhumanism presents a critique through an anarchist and transhumanist lens of ableism, cisheteropatriarchy and primitivism. Anarcho-transhumanists also criticise non-anarchist forms of transhumanism such as democratic transhumanism and libertarian transhumanism as incoherent and unsurvivable due to their preservation of capitalism and the state. They view such instruments of power as inherently unethical and incompatible with the acceleration of social and material freedom for all individuals.

Post-anarchism 

Post-anarchism is articulated by Saul Newman as a theoretical move towards a synthesis of classical anarchist theory and poststructuralist thought. Although it first received popular attention in his book From Bakunin to Lacan, it has taken on a life of its own subsequent to Newman's use of the term and a wide range of ideas including post-modernism, autonomism, post-left anarchy, situationism, post-colonialism and Zapatismo. By its very nature, post-anarchism rejects the idea that it should be a coherent set of doctrines and beliefs. As such it is difficult, if not impossible, to state with any degree of certainty who should or should not be grouped under the rubric. Nonetheless, key thinkers associated with post-anarchism include Saul Newman, Duane Rousselle, Todd May, Lewis Call, Gilles Deleuze, Félix Guattari and Michel Onfray.

Post-left anarchy 

Post-left anarchy is a recent current in anarchist thought that promotes a critique of anarchism's relationship to traditional leftism. Some post-leftists seek to escape the confines of ideology in general also presenting a critique of organizations and morality. Influenced by the work of Max Stirner and by the Situationist International, post-left anarchy is marked by a focus on social insurrection and a rejection of leftist social organisation.

The magazines Anarchy: A Journal of Desire Armed, Green Anarchy and Fifth Estate have been involved in developing post-left anarchy. Individual writers associated with the tendency are Hakim Bey, Bob Black, John Zerzan, Jason McQuinn, Fredy Perlman, Lawrence Jarach and Wolfi Landstreicher. The contemporary network of collectives CrimethInc. is an exponent of post-left anarchist views.

Queer anarchism 

Queer anarchism suggests anarchism as a means of queer liberation and solution to the issues faced by the LGBT community such as homophobia, lesbophobia, transmisogyny, biphobia, transphobia, heteronormativity, patriarchy and the gender binary.

People who campaigned for LGBT rights both outside and inside the anarchist and LGBT movements include John Henry Mackay, Adolf Brand and Daniel Guérin. Individualist anarchist Adolf Brand published Der Eigene from 1896 to 1932 in Berlin, the first sustained journal dedicated to gay issues.

Types of organization 
Anarchists create different forms of organization to meet each other, share information, organize struggles and trace ways to spread the anarchist ideas through the world. Those organizations tend to be structured around the principles of anarchism, i.e. without hierarchy, coercion, and with voluntary association, since they understand that the only way to achieve a free and egualitarian society in the end is through equally free and egualitarian means.

Synthesis anarchism 

Synthesis anarchism is a form of anarchist organization which tries to join anarchists of different tendencies under the principles of anarchism without adjectives. It intends to bringing together anarchists of the anarchists main tendencies, namely individualist anarchism, anarchist communism and mutualism. In the 1920s, this form found as its main proponents Volin and Sébastien Faure. It is the main principle behind the anarchist federations grouped around the contemporary global International of Anarchist Federations.

Platformism 

Platformism is a tendency within the wider anarchist movement which shares an affinity with organising in the tradition of Dielo Truda's Organizational Platform of the General Union of Anarchists (Draft). The document was based on the experiences of Russian anarchists in the 1917 October Revolution which led eventually to the victory of Bolsheviks over the anarchists and other like-minded groups. The Platform attempted to explain and address the anarchist movement's failures during the Russian Revolution. As a controversial pamphlet, the document drew both praise and criticism from anarchists worldwide. Today, platformism is an important current in international anarchism. Around thirty platformists and specifists are linked together in the Anarkismo project, including groups from Africa, Europe, Latin America and North America.

Anarcho-syndicalism 

In the early 20th century, anarcho-syndicalism arose as a distinct school of thought within anarchism. More heavily focused on the labour movement than previous forms of anarchism, syndicalism posits radical trade unions as a potential force for revolutionary social change, replacing capitalism and the state with a new society, democratically self-managed by the workers. Anarcho-syndicalists seek to abolish the wage system and private ownership of the means of production, which they believe lead to class divisions. Important principles of syndicalism include workers' solidarity, direct action (such as general strikes and workplace recuperations) and workers' self-management.

Anarcho-syndicalism and other branches of anarchism are not mutually exclusive. Anarcho-syndicalists often subscribe to communist or collectivist anarchism. Its advocates propose labour organization as a means to create the foundations of a non-hierarchical anarchist society within the current system and bring about social revolution. According to the writers of An Anarchist FAQ, anarcho-syndicalist economic systems often take the form of either an anarcho-communist or collectivist anarchist economic system.

Rudolf Rocker is considered a leading anarcho-syndicalist theorist. He outlined a view of the origins of the movement, what it sought and why it was important to the future of labour in his 1938 pamphlet Anarchosyndicalism. Noam Chomsky sees anarcho-syndicalist and libertarian socialist ideas as the descendants of the classical liberal ideas of the Age of Enlightenment, arguing that his ideological position revolves around "nourishing the libertarian and creative character of the human being". He envisions an anarcho-syndicalist future with direct worker control of the means of production and government by workers' councils, who would select representatives to meet together at general assemblies.

Although more frequently associated with labor struggles of the early 20th century (particularly in France and Spain), many syndicalist organizations are active today, including the SAC in Sweden, the USI in Italy and the CNT in Spain. A number of these organizations are united across national borders by membership in the International Workers' Association.

Insurrectionary anarchism 

Insurrectionary anarchism is a revolutionary theory, practice and tendency within the anarchist movement which emphasizes the theme of insurrection within anarchist practice. It opposes formal organizations such as labor unions and federations that are based on a political programme and periodic congresses. Instead, insurrectionary anarchists support informal organization and small affinity group based organization. Insurrectionary anarchists put value in attack, permanent class conflict and a refusal to negotiate or compromise with class enemies.

Contemporary insurrectionary anarchism inherits the views and tactics of anti-organizational anarcho-communism and illegalism.

See also 

 Anarchism and anarcho-capitalism
 Anarchism and the arts
 Anarchism and capitalism
 Anarchism and education
 Anarchism and nationalism
 Anarchism and Friedrich Nietzsche
 Anarchism and violence
 Definition of anarchism and libertarianism
 Epistemological anarchism
 Issues in anarchism
 Left-libertarianism
 Left-wing market anarchism
 Libertarianism
 Panarchism

External links

References 

 
Schools of thought
Issues in anarchism